Paul Hanley and Jordan Kerr were the defending champions, but lost in the quarterfinals to Philipp Petzschner and Alexander Peya.

Seeds

Draw

Draw

External links
Draw

Doubles